Ergi is an old Norse word.

Ergi may also refer to:

Given name
Ergi Borshi (born 1995), Albanian football
Ergi Dini (1994–2016), Albanian singer, winner of the third season of X Factor Albania
Ergi Kırkın (born 1999), Turkish tennis player
Ergi Tırpancı (born 2000), Turkish basketball player

Other uses
ERGI, or ERG Iserlohn, a roller hockey team from Iserlohn, Germany.

See also
Ergis (disambiguation)